Lofoten is an archipelago and a traditional district in the county of Nordland, Norway. Lofoten has distinctive scenery with dramatic mountains and peaks, open sea and sheltered bays, beaches and untouched lands. The archipelago experiences one of the world's largest elevated temperature anomalies relative to its high latitude.

Etymology 
Lofoten was the original name of the island Vestvågøya. The first element is ló (i.e., "lynx") and the last element is derived from Norse fótr (i.e., "foot"), as the shape of the island must have been compared with that of a lynx's foot. (The old name of the neighbouring island Flakstadøya was Vargfót, "wolf's foot", from vargr "wolf".) Alternatively it could derive from the word for light in reference to the presence of Aurora Borealis as the word for light itself is the root of the Old Norse word for lynx lóa, although the earliest evidence suggests Lófótr was first the name of the island of Vestvågøy and only later becoming the name of the chain of islands. Most parsimonious is the analogy with Aurora Borealis, as the word fótr is typically not used to describe the feet of beasts of prey, instead using the word hrammr (paw) or löpp (also paw) for animals such as cats or dogs. Fótr can be used to describe legs, and as such, light leg represents the most plausible etymology taking into account the geography of the archipelago, eventually morphing to describe only the island of Vestvågøy before once again describing the island chain from its main island.

Another name one might come across, is "Lofotveggen" or the Lofoten wall.

History 

According to Robert M. and others: "There is evidence of human settlement extending back at least 11,000 years in Lofoten, and the earliest archaeological sites ... are only about 5,500 years old, at the transition from the early to late Stone Age." Iron Age agriculture, livestock, and significant human habitation can be traced back to 

The town of Vågan (Norse Vágar) is the first known town formation in northern Norway. It existed in the early Viking Age, maybe earlier, and was located on the southern coast on eastern Lofoten, near today's village Kabelvåg in Vågan municipality. The Lofotr Viking Museum with the reconstructed  longhouse (the largest known) is located near Borg on Vestvågøy, which has many archeological finds from the Iron Age and Viking Age.

The islands have for more than 1,000 years been the centre of great cod fisheries, especially in winter, when the cod migrate south from the Barents Sea and gather in Lofoten to spawn. Bergen in southwestern Norway was for a long time the hub for further export of cod south to different parts of Europe, particularly so when trade was controlled by the Hanseatic League. In the lowland areas, particularly Vestvågøy, agriculture plays a significant role, as it has done since the Bronze Age.

In March 1941 the islands were raided by British Commandos during Operation Claymore, and in a subsequent diversionary attack to support the Vaagso raid in December.

As of 2017, the islands attract one million tourists a year.

Geography 

Lofoten is located at the 68th and 69th parallels north of the Arctic Circle in North Norway. Lofoten encompasses the municipalities of Vågan, Vestvågøy, Flakstad, Moskenes, Værøy, and Røst. The principal islands, running from north to south are:

Southern tip of Hinnøya.
Southern 60% (approx.) of Austvågøy ( in total )
Gimsøya
Vestvågøy
Flakstadøya
Moskenesøya

Further to the south are the small and isolated islands of Værøy and Røst.
Many will argue that Hinnøya, the northern part of Austvågøy and several hundred smaller islands, skerries and rocks to the east of Austvågøy are also part of the Lofoten complex. Historically, the territorial definition of Lofoten has changed significantly. Between the mainland and the Lofoten archipelago lies the vast, open Vestfjorden, and to the north is Vesterålen. The principal towns in Lofoten are Leknes in Vestvågøy and Svolvær in Vågan. The main islands are joined to each other and the mainland by road bridges.

The Lofoten Islands are characterised by their mountains and peaks, sheltered inlets, stretches of seashore and large virgin areas. The highest mountain in Lofoten is Higravstinden in Austvågøy; the Møysalen National Park just northeast of Lofoten has mountains reaching . The famous Moskstraumen (Malstrøm) system of tidal eddies is located in western Lofoten, and is indeed the root of the term maelstrom.

Geology 

Lofoten is a horst ridge of bedrock. The rocks of Lofoten belong to the wider Western Gneiss Region of Norway. Some of the high relief and irregular surfaces of Lofoten has been attributed to etching that took place during the Mesozoic Era. Evidence of this would be the kaolinite found at some locations. To the northwest the Lofoten archipelago is bounded by the NE–SW-trending West Lofoten Border Fault. This is a normal fault whose fault scarp has been eroded forming a strandflat.

In Vestvågøya mountains have steep slopes towards the open sea in the northwest and southeast while slopes pointing towards the interior of the island are more gentle. This is the result of erosion acting on a landscape that has been uplifted along NE–SW-trending faults in the margins of Lofoten while the interior axis has remained more stable. In tectonic terms mountains are half-grabens and faults are of the dip-slip type.

The sea around Lofoten is known to host significant oil reserves: 1.3 bn barrels. Oil extraction in the Lofoten area is prohibited.

Wildlife 
The sea is rich with life, and the world's largest deep water coral reef, called the Røst Reef, is located west of Røst. Approximately 70% of all fish caught in the Norwegian and Barents seas use its islands' waters as a breeding ground. 
Otters are common, and there are elk on the largest islands. There are some woodlands with downy birch and rowan. There are no native conifer forests in Lofoten, but some small areas with private spruce plantations. Sorbus hybrida (rowan whitebeam) and Malus sylvestris occur in Lofoten, but not further north.

Birds
Some 27,000 ha of marine waters along the north-western coasts and fjords of the Lofoten Islands has been designated an Important Bird Area (IBA) by BirdLife International (BLI) because it supports overwintering populations of common eiders and yellow-billed loons. The IBA contains or overlaps with the Seløya, Morfjorden, Laukvikøyene, Eggum and Borgværet nature reserves, as well as the Laukvikøyene Ramsar site. Lofoten has a high density of sea eagles and cormorants, and millions of other sea birds, among them the colourful puffin. It has mainland Europe's largest seabird colony. The birds once mistaken for the extinct great auk turned out to be some of the nine king penguins released around Norway's Lofoten Islands in August 1936, there until at least 1944.

Climate 
Lofoten features a mostly subpolar oceanic climate (Cfc) under the Köppen climate classification, although some parts like Skrova features a temperate oceanic climate (Cfb). Winter temperatures in Lofoten are extremely mild considering its location north of the Arctic Circle – possibly the largest positive temperature anomaly in the world relative to latitude. The mild winters are a result of the temperate waters of the Norwegian Sea, which is warmed by the North Atlantic Current and the Norwegian Current. The mild air (Lows) from the Atlantic having a free path northwards even in winter is also very significant. 

Strong winds can occur in late autumn and winter. Snow and sleet are not uncommon in winter.  The mountains can have substantial amounts of snow, and avalanches may come down from the steep slopes.

In Svolvær, the sun is above the horizon continuously ("midnight sun") from 25 May to 17 July, and in winter the sun does not rise from 4 December to 7 January. In Leknes, the sun is above the horizon from 26 May to 17 July, and in winter the sun does not rise from 9 December to 4 January.

The temperature in the sea has been recorded since 1935.
Skrova lighthouse on an island near Svolvær has the longest recording of air temperature in Lofoten. Last overnight freeze in June was in 1962, and last freeze in September was in 1986. Skrova and nearby Svolvær are among those places in North Norway which can record what Norwegians know as "tropical nights" when the overnight low does not go below . The warmest night recorded in Lofoten was  July 1 1972 at Skrova with low , and the earliest in summer was June 10th 2011 with low . The wettest month recorded is December 1936 with 227 mm, and the driest is January 2014 with 0.9 mm. 

Even if the islands are not that large, there are some climatic differences. The islands in the southwest, Værøy and Røst, have the warmest winters, but summer highs are cooler. Vestvågøy with the town Leknes has lowland in the interior of the island with mountains nearby; winters here are slightly colder and much wetter than at Skrova, while summers are drier and comparable.

Sport

Mountaineering and rock climbing 

Lofoten offers many rock climbing and mountaineering opportunities. The main centre for rock climbing is Henningsvær on Austvågøya.

The main areas for mountaineering and climbing are on Austvågøy and Moskenesøya. Moskenesøya features remote and serious mountaineering whereas Austvågøy is very popular area for rock climbing.

Football 
Lofoten has one of the world's most noteworthy football pitches. The pitch rests on a rocky islet which has no actual seats.

Surfing 
Unstad is one of its better known locations for surfing. Every September surfers from around the world visit to compete in the Lofoten Masters.

Cycling 

There is a well-marked cycling route that goes from Å in the south and continues past Fiskebøl in the north. The route is part public road, part cycle-path with the option to bypass all of the tunnels by either cycle-path (tunnels through mountains) or boat. Traffic is generally light, although in July there may be a lot of campervans. Some of the more remote sections are on gravel roads. There is a dedicated cycling ferry which sails between Ballstad and Nusfjord, allowing cyclists to avoid the long, steep Nappstraum tunnel. The route hugs the coastline for most of its length where it is generally flat. As it turns inland through the mountain passes there are a couple of  climbs.

The Lofoten Insomnia Cycling Race takes place every year around midsummer, possible in the midnight sun, but certainly in 24-hour daylight, along the whole Lofoten archipelago.

The Arctic Race of Norway, the world's northernmost professional stage race on road bike which takes place every year in Northern Norway, crossed the Lofoten islands during its first edition in August 2013. , the race was planned to be back in 2019 from Thursday 15 August to Sunday 18 August. The first two stages will cross the Lofoten archipelago from west to east.

Transportation 

The European road E10 connects the larger islands of Lofoten with bridges and undersea tunnels. The E10 road also connects Lofoten to the mainland of Norway through the Lofast road connection, which was officially opened on 1 December 2007. There are several daily bus services between the islands of Lofoten and between Lofoten and the mainland along E10.

Lofoten is also served by a number of small airports:
Leknes Airport (101,757 passengers in 2014)
Svolvær Airport, Helle (74,496 passengers in 2014)
Røst Airport (9,889 passengers in 2014), which mainly offers flights to Bodø.
A heliport at Værøy (9,420 passengers in 2014)
Stokmarknes Airport, Skagen (93,782 passengers in 2016) is located in Vesterålen.
Harstad/Narvik Airport, Evenes has direct flights to Oslo and Trondheim.

Bodø is often used as a hub for travel to Lofoten. In addition to air travel there is a ferry connecting Bodø to Moskenes. There is also a ferry connecting Svolvær to Skutvik in Hamarøy, with road connection east to E6. Hurtigruten calls at Stamsund and Svolvær.

Culture

Visual arts 
 (Lofoten internasjonale kunstfestival, LIAF) is a contemporary art biennale with no set venue or location on the archipelago. Artists who have participated include Kjersti Andvig, Michel Auder, A K Dolven, Ida Ekblad, Elmgreen & Dragset, and Lawrence Weiner.

The  (Nordnorsk Kunstnersenter, NNKS) was established in Svolvær in 1979.

 is a privately-owned contemporary art space in Henningsvær.

The  (Nordland kunst- og filmhøgskole, NKFS) was established in Kabelvåg in 1997.

In popular culture

Literature 
 Edgar Allan Poe's short story "A Descent into the Maelström" tells the story of a man who survived his ship being drawn into and swallowed by Moskstraumen.
Many of the novels of Knut Hamsun are situated in the Lofoten.
 Jules Verne's novel Twenty Thousand Leagues Under the Sea (1870) concludes with the Nautilus having fallen into the Maelström, and Prof. Aronnax, Conseil and Ned Land, who had been attempting to escape when the Nautilus began its fall, washed up on an island in the Lofotens.
 Johan Bojer's novel The Last of the Vikings (1922) tells the story of the Lofoten cod fishermen.
 In Ole Edvart Rølvaag's novel Giants in the Earth, the Norwegian protagonists settling in Dakota Territory are immigrants from Lofoten.
 The poem "Pilot Nagel" from the Greek sailor-poet Nikos Kavvadias tells the story of the Norwegian sailor Nagel Harbor, who dies at the port of Colombo, while escorting a steamer tank on its way to his homeland, the Lofoten islands.

Films 
In the film Maelström, Lofoten is where the ashes of Annstein Karson are distributed.
In the film The Sunlit Night, Lofoten is where the protagonist Frances decides to aid a fellow critically reviled artist.

Television 
 The Norwegian television crime drama series Twin, which premiered on 27 October 2019 on NRK, is set in the Lofoten Islands.

 The Grand Tour: A Scandi Flick special was filmed in Lofoten in 2022.

Paintings 
Norwegian painter Gunnar Berg was known for his paintings of his native Lofoten. He principally painted scenes of the everyday life of the local fishermen. Other artists whose work has been associated with Lofoten include Adelsteen Normann, Otto Sinding, Christian Krohg, Theodor Kittelsen and Lev Lagorio.

Music 
In 2004, Nurse with Wound broadcast 24 unexpected radio transmissions from the Lofoten Islands, whose sounds were sourced from the environment and objects found in Lofoten. These recordings are included on their three releases entitled Shipwreck Radio.

See also 
 Atlantic cod

References

Further reading

External links 

 
 Unesco World Heritage – Lofoten archipelago on the tentative list

 
Archipelagoes of Norway
Archipelagoes of the Norwegian Sea
Districts of Nordland
Fishing communities in Norway
Landforms of Nordland
Horsts (geology)
Important Bird Areas of Norway
Important Bird Areas of Arctic islands
Seabird colonies